Sporting Clube de Portugal B is the reserve team of Portuguese football club Sporting CP, a team based in Lisbon. Reserve teams in Portugal play in the same league system as the senior team, rather than in a reserve team league. However, they cannot play in the same division as their senior team, so Sporting B is ineligible for promotion to the Primeira Liga and could not play in the Taça de Portugal and Taça da Liga. The team play at the Estádio Aurélio Pereira in the Academia Sporting which holds a seating capacity of 1,200.

Sporting had a B team until the end of the 2003–04 season when was dissolved. The team was refounded in the 2012–13 season, when a new set of rules regarding B teams was introduced in Portuguese football system. In that season, another five B-teams were refounded and entered into Segunda Liga. In the 2017–18 season after the creation of a sub-23 championship, club president Bruno de Carvalho announced the end of Sporting CP B.

President Frederico Varandas decided to refound Sporting CP B in 2019. In 2021 Sporting CP B is going to play in Liga 3, a new tier in the Portuguese league system.

This was the 1st club of footballing legend Cristiano Ronaldo.

History
Sporting CP had a B-team which competed in the third tier from 2000 to 2004. 

Prior to the end of the 2011–12 football season in Portugal, seven clubs in the Primeira Liga announced their interest in constructing a B team to fill the six vacant places available to compete in the Segunda Liga for the 2012–13 season. Of those seven, five clubs were selected to take part in the competition considering their position in the 2011–12 Primeira Liga, as well as Marítimo, since they had already a B team competing. The LPFP, the organism responsible for the professional football in Portugal, announced that for the clubs to compete in the 2012–13 Segunda Liga they would have to pay €50,000. In addition, they had to comply with new rules regarding player selection in which each 'B' team must have a squad of a minimum of ten players who were formed at the club's academy as well as having an age requirement between 15 and 21 years old. The LPFP also went on to saw that the clubs are unable to compete in cup competitions as well as gaining promotion due to the possibility of playing the senior team. Each 'B' team may have three players above 23-years old.

In late May 2012, it was officially announced that the six Primeira Liga clubs' B teams would compete in the 2012–13 Segunda Liga which would increase the number of teams in the league from 16 to 22 as well as increasing the number of games needed to play in one season from 30 games to 42 games. Sporting B's first season back ended with a best-ever fourth place, under managers Oceano and later José Dominguez.

After the announcement of the creation of an under-23 championship in February 2018, club president Bruno de Carvalho announced the end of Sporting CP B. 

After the dismissal of Carvalho in August 2018, Sousa Cintra reverted the former's decision, subscribing the reserve team to the new season in the Campeonato de Portugal (Portuguese football's third tier), but he later gave up, with Santa Iria replacing Sporting CP B.

In 2019, President Frederico Varandas decided to refound Sporting CP B for the next year's  Campeonato de Portugal.

In 2021, Sporting CP B is going to play in Liga 3, a new tier in the Portuguese league system, beginning with the 2021–22 season.

Players

Current squad

Other players under contract

Out on loan

Managerial history 
  Vítor Damas (2000–2001)
  Jean Paul Castro (2001–2002)
  Luís Alegria (2002–2003)
  Jean Paul Castro (2003–2004)
  Oceano da Cruz (July 2012 – Oct 2012)
  José Dominguez (Oct 2012 – June 2013)
  Abel Ferreira (July 2013 – July 2014)
  Francisco Barão (July 2014 – Oct 2014)
  João de Deus (Oct 2014– 2017)
  Filipe Celikkaya (July 2020– )

References

External links
 Official club website 
 Club Profile at ForaDeJogo 
 Club Profile at LPFP 
 Club Profile at ZeroZero 

Football clubs in Portugal
Portuguese reserve football teams
Sporting CP
 
2000 establishments in Portugal
2012 establishments in Portugal
2020 establishments in Portugal
Association football clubs established in 2000
Association football clubs established in 2012
Association football clubs established in 2020
Association football clubs disestablished in 2004
Association football clubs disestablished in 2018
2004 disestablishments in Portugal
2018 disestablishments in Portugal
Liga Portugal 2 clubs